The Best American Short Stories 2010, a volume in The Best American Short Stories series, was edited by Heidi Pitlor and by guest editor Richard Russo.

Short Stories included

Notes

External links
 Best American Short Stories

2010 anthologies
Fiction anthologies
Short Stories 2010
Houghton Mifflin books